MonashHeart is a non-profit cross-site cardiological service operating within the southern region of Victoria's Metropolitan Health Services.

MonashHeart is co-located with Monash Medical Centre and is part of Monash Health, the largest public health service in Victoria. MonashHeart operates from three sites, all within the Southern Health network of hospitals covering populations located south-east of Melbourne. Clinical services are provided at Monash Medical Centre, Clayton, Dandenong Hospital and Casey Hospital.

The MonashHeart service will relocate to the new Victorian Heart Hospital, Australia's first standalone cardiac hospital, when it's completed in 2022.

The current director is Professor Stephen Nicholls.

MonashHeart is one of the premier cardiac services the world, ranked 45 in the 2021 World's Best Specialised Hospitals.

History
MonashHeart is an amalgamation of the former Departments of Cardiology of Monash Medical Centre, Clayton and Dandenong Hospital. In 2007, the two departments were merged to create one service across multiple sites (Clayton, Victoria and Dandenong, Victoria), creating MonashHeart.

Ian Meredith was the director from 2005 to 2017.

On 26 May 2009, Victorian Health Minister at the time, Daniel Andrews officially opened the third site for MonashHeart at Casey Hospital in Berwick, Victoria

MonashHeart is named after Sir John Monash (1865-1931), the highly decorated Australian military commander of the First World War.

Services
MonashHeart's services are divided into six clinical service sub-specialities:
Acute cardiac 
Non-invasive imaging  
Cardiac Computed Tomography (CT)  
Paediatric cardiology and congenital heart disease 
Cardiac rhythm management 
Interventional

Research and education
The Monash Cardiovascular Research Centre (MCRC)  is a self-funding, independent research group within the Faculty of Medicine, Nursing and Health Sciences at Monash University (through the Southern Clinical School and Departments of Medicine and Surgery, Monash Medical Centre).

Medical firsts 
 First robotic heart operation in the southern hemisphere
 First Arctic Front case in Australia
 First WATCHMAN case in Australia
 First Australian centre approved for independent percutaneous valve replacement

Notable cases 
Victoria's youngest person to have a heart rate monitored over the internet

See also
 Healthcare in Australia

References

External links
MonashHeart official website

Hospitals in Melbourne
Hospitals established in 2007
2007 establishments in Australia